Pierre Dulivier was the Governor General of Pondicherry for two periods. He was preceded by François Martin and succeeded by Guillaume André d'Hébert.

References

Titles

Year of birth missing
Year of death missing
French colonial governors and administrators
Governors of French India